Sokal is a city in Ukraine.

Sokal may also refer to:
 "Sokal" (song), a 2014 song by Nadezhda Misyakova
 Sokal (surname)
 Ukrainian Catholic Eparchy of Sokal, an eparchy of the Ukrainian Greek Catholic Church

See also
 
 Sokol (disambiguation)
 Sokil (disambiguation)